WJ Please? is the fifth extended play by South Korean-Chinese girl group WJSN. It was released on September 19, 2018, by Starship Entertainment and distributed by Kakao M. It contains a total of six songs, including the lead single "Save Me, Save You".

Background and release 
On September 3, Starship Entertainment revealed that WJSN would release a new album on September 19.

Members Meiqi, Xuanyi, and Cheng Xiao did not participate in the album's promotions due to activities in China, but took part in the recordings of "Hurry Up" and "You & I".

On the day of the album's release, the music video of the lead single "Save Me, Save You" was also released.

Track listing

Charts

Weekly

Monthly

Awards and nominations

Music program wins

Release history

References 

Korean-language EPs
Starship Entertainment EPs
Cosmic Girls EPs
2018 EPs